Alopecosa pentheri is a species of wolf spiders in the genus Alopecosa found in Europe (Bulgaria, Greece) to Azerbaijan.

See also 
 List of Lycosidae species

References

External links 

pentheri
Spiders of Europe
Spiders of Asia
Fauna of Azerbaijan
Spiders described in 1905